Tomáš Grigar (born 1 February 1983 in Ostrava) is a Czech football goalkeeper currently playing for FK Teplice in the Czech Republic. He was a member of the Czech Republic national football team for a short period of time.

References

External links
 
 

1983 births
Living people
Czech footballers
Czech Republic youth international footballers
Czech Republic under-21 international footballers
Czech Republic international footballers
Association football goalkeepers
Czech First League players
MFK Vítkovice players
FK Teplice players
AC Sparta Prague players
Sportspeople from Ostrava